Reedy Creek is a tributary of the Little Kanawha River in western West Virginia in the United States.

Reedy Creek is formed in the town of Reedy in northern Roane County by the confluence of its Left Fork and its Right Fork:

From the town of Reedy, the main stem of Reedy Creek flows generally northward into Wirt County, through the community of Lucille; it flows into the Little Kanawha River from the south in the community of Palestine.  It is paralleled for most of its length by West Virginia Route 14.

Among Reedy Creek's tributaries are two others with names derived from that of the main stream:

According to the West Virginia Department of Environmental Protection, approximately 79% of the Reedy Creek watershed is forested, mostly deciduous.  Approximately 20% is used for pasture and agriculture.

See also
List of rivers of West Virginia

References 

Rivers of West Virginia
Little Kanawha River
Rivers of Roane County, West Virginia
Rivers of Wirt County, West Virginia